The new areas or new districts of the People's Republic of China are new urban districts that are given special economic and development support by the Chinese Central Government or regional government. New areas are divided into two varieties: administrative or management and further divided into levels: state-level, provincial-level, and prefectural-level.

State-level new areas

The State-level new areas of the People's Republic of China are special economic-development zones supported by the central government. The zones are parts of cities at various levels in the formal hierarchy but are known as "national-level" or "state-level" in reference to the preferential policies and privileges that are granted directly by the State Council. These privileges are to encourage and attract new developments (particularly foreign direct investment) to speed up the city's economy.

Provincial-level and prefectural-level new areas
Provincial-level and prefectural-level new areas are not governed by the central government rather by the provincial or prefectural government.

 Cangzhou - Bohai New Area
 Fuzhou - Jinshan New Area
 Longyan - New Area
 Nanjing - Jiangbei New Area
 Ningbo - Hangzhou Bay New Area
 Nanping - Wuyi New Area
 Qinghuangdao - Beidaihe New Area
 Suzhou:
 Suzhou Industrial Park
 Suzhou New District
 Shenzhen - Dapeng New District
 Tianjin - Tianjin Northern New Area
 Wuxi - Wuxi New Area
 Zhenjiang - Zhenjiang New Area
 Zhongshan - Cuiheng New Area
 Zhuhai - Hengqin New Area
 Anyang - Anyang New Area
 Ganzhou - Zhangkang New Area
 Kaifeng - Kaifeng New Area
 Luoyang - Luoyang New Area
 Ma'anshan
 Bingjiang New Area
 Bowang New Area
 Xiushan New Area
 Zhengpugang New Area
 Nanchang - Honggutan New District
 Xinyu - Xinyu New Area
 Zhengzhou
 Zhengbian New Area
 Zhengdong New Area
 Dalian
 Jinzhou New Area
 Pulandian Bay New Area
 Shenyang
 Hunnan New District
 Shenbei New Area
 Chongqing - New North Zone
 Guiyang - Jinyang New Area
 Lhasa - Niu New Area
 Ordos - Kangbashi New Area
 Suining  - Hedong New Area
 Xi'an - Qujiang New District

County-level new areas

Jingmen - Zhanghe New Area
Minhe - Chuanyuan New Area (川垣新区)

Township-level new areas
 Shayang County - Binjiang New Area
 Dawu County, Hubei - High-speed Railway New Area
 Huainan - Shannan New Area
 , Hotan County, Hotan Prefecture, Xinjiang

References

 
Foreign trade of China
Economic development in China
Trade in China
Industry in China